Sovetscoe or Sovietscoe (Sovyets’ke, Sovetskoye) is a commune in the Rîbnița District of Transnistria, Moldova. It is composed of two villages, Sovetscoe and Vasilievca (Васильевка). It has since 1990 been administered as a part of the self-proclaimed Pridnestrovian Moldavian Republic (PMR).

References

Communes of Transnistria
Rîbnița District